The 2017–18 Indonesian Basketball League is the third season of the Starting5 as a promoter of the league. The second foreign player draft was held on October 2, 2017. The regular season will begin on December 8, 2017 and end on February 25, 2018. The All-Star break will be on January 7, 2018 and will be held in Jakarta.

Teams

Transactions

Draft lottery 
The 2017 IBL draft lottery was held on October 2.

Draft selections

First round

Second round

*Player switch for undrafted

Foreign Players

Rookie Players

Series Hosts

Initial Schedule 
Series 1: Jakarta// 8-10 December, 2017

Series 2: Bandung// 15-17 December, 2017

Series 3: Semarang// 22-24 December, 2017

Series 4: Yogyakarta// 5-7 January, 2018

All-Star: Yogyakarta// 13-14 January, 2018

Series 5: Solo// 19-21 January, 2018

Series 6: Malang// 26-28 January, 2018

Series 7: Surabaya// 2-4 February, 2018

Series 8: Cirebon// 23-25 February, 2018

New Schedule 
Due to delay in Jakarta series venue renovation, a new schedule has been released for the upcoming season.

Series 1: Semarang// 8-10 December, 2017 - GOR Sahabat 

Series 2: Bandung// 15-17 December, 2017 - GOR C-Tra Arena

Series 3: Solo// 23-25 December, 2017 - Sritex Arena 

Series 4: Jakarta// 4-6 January, 2018 - BritAma Arena 

All-Star: Jakarta// 7 January, 2018

Series 5: Surabaya// 19-21 January, 2018 - DBL Arena 

Series 6: Yogyakarta// 26-28 January, 2018 - GOR UNY( Yogyakarta State University) 

Series 7: Cirebon// 2-4 February, 2018 - GMC Basketball Arena 

Series 8: Malang// 23-25 February, 2018 - GOR Bimasakti

Regular season 

Notes:s Semi-finalsx First round

Statistics

Individual game highs

Individual statistic

Individual awards 
Most Valuable Player : Xaverius Prawiro (Pelita Jaya Energi Mega Persada)

Foreign Player of the Year : David Seagers (Pacific Caesar Surabaya)

Most Inspiration Young Player of the Year : Henry Lakay (Satya Wacana Salatiga)

Rookie of the Year : Abraham Wenas (Hangtuah Sumatera Selatan)

Coach of the Year : Kencana Wukir (Pacific Caesar Surabaya)

Defensive Player of the Year : C. J. Giles (Pelita Jaya Energi Mega Persada)

Sixthman of the Year : Andakara Prastawa (Aspac Jakarta)

Most Improve Player of the Year : Nuke Tri Saputra (Pacific Caesar Surabaya)

All-Indonesian Team

 Xaverius Prawiro SG (Pelita Jaya Energi Mega Persada)
 Abraham Dhamar Grahita SG (Aspac Jakarta)
 Respati Ragil Pamungkas SG (Pelita Jaya Energi Mega Persada)
 Christian Ronaldo Sitepu C (Satria Muda Pertamina Jakarta)
 Arki Dikania Wisnu SF (Satria Muda Pertamina Jakarta)

First team Rookie

 Abraham Wenas PG (Hangtuah Sumatera Selatan)
 Andre Rorimpandey SG (NSH Jakarta)
 Kevin Moses Poetiray PF (Siliwangi Bandung)
 Fredy Bactiar SG/SF (Siliwangi Bandung)
 Reza Guntara C (Garuda Bandung)

All-Star Games

Pre-game 
Skill-challenge champion :  Nuke Tri Saputra (Pacific Caesar Surabaya)

Three-point contest champion :  Andakara Prastawa (Stapac Jakarta)

Slam-dunk contest champion :  George Nashon (Hangtuah Sumatera Selatan)

Game

Red Team

White Team

All-Star MVP

Playoffs

First round Red Division

Semi-final Red Division

First round White Division

Semi-final White Division

IBL Finals

References

2017–18 in Asian basketball leagues
2018 in Indonesian sport